In philosophy, facticity has multiple meanings--from "factuality" and "contingency" to the intractable conditions of human existence.

Early usage

The term is first used by German philosopher Johann Gottlieb Fichte (17621814) and has a variety of meanings. It can refer to facts and factuality, as in nineteenth-century positivism, but comes to mean that which resists explanation and interpretation in Wilhelm Dilthey and Neo-Kantianism. The Neo-Kantians contrasted facticity with ideality, as does Jürgen Habermas in Between Facts and Norms (Faktizität und Geltung).

Heidegger
German philosopher Martin Heidegger (1889-1976) discusses "facticity" as the "thrownness" (Geworfenheit) of individual existence, which is to say we are "thrown into the world."  By this, he is not only referring to a brute fact, or the factuality of a concrete historical situation, e.g., "born in the '80s." Facticity is something that already informs and has been taken up in existence, even if it is unnoticed or left unattended. As such, facticity is not something we come across and directly behold. In moods, for example, facticity has an enigmatic appearance, which involves both turning toward and away from it. For Heidegger, moods are conditions of thinking and willing to which they must in some way respond. The thrownness of human existence (or Dasein) is accordingly disclosed through moods.

Sartre and de Beauvoir
In the mid-20th century works of French existentialists Jean-Paul Sartre and Simone de Beauvoir, facticity signifies all of the concrete details against the background of which human freedom exists and is limited. For example, these may include the time and place of birth, a language, an environment, an individual's previous choices, as well as the inevitable prospect of their death. For example: currently, the situation of a person who is born without legs precludes their freedom to walk on the beach; if future medicine were to develop a method of growing new legs for that person, their facticity might no longer exclude this activity.

Recent usage
Facticity is a term that takes on a more specialized meaning in 20th century continental philosophy, especially in phenomenology and existentialism, including Edmund Husserl, Martin Heidegger, Jean-Paul Sartre, Maurice Merleau-Ponty and Theodor Adorno. Recent philosophers such as Giorgio Agamben, Jean-Luc Nancy, Byung-Chul Han and François Raffoul have taken up the notion of facticity in new ways.

Facticity plays a key part in Quentin Meillassoux's philosophical project to challenge the thought-world relationship of correlationism. Meillassoux defines it as “the absence of reason for any reality; in other words, the impossibility of providing an ultimate ground for the existence of any being.”

See also
Being for itself

References

Further reading

	

Existentialist concepts
Hermeneutics
Jean-Paul Sartre
Martin Heidegger
Ontology
Phenomenology
Simone de Beauvoir